Palo Alto Township is a township in Jasper County, Iowa, USA.

History
Palo Alto Township was established in 1857. Its name commemorates the Battle of Palo Alto in the Mexican–American War.

References

Townships in Jasper County, Iowa
Townships in Iowa
1857 establishments in Iowa
Populated places established in 1857